Oleksin  is a village in the administrative district of Gmina Kotuń, within Siedlce County, Masovian Voivodeship, in east-central Poland.

The village has a population of 180.

References

Oleksin